The Little Wekiva River is a stream in Greater Orlando area of Florida in the United States. The Little Wekiva drainage basin is about  located in the urbanized area north and west of Downtown Orlando.

As of 2021, much of the Little Wekiva River has silted up.

Sources
Little Wekiva is part of the middle basin of the St. Johns River. The Geographic Names Information System (GNIS), though, list the source of the river at Spring Lake, an  spring-fed lake in Altamonte Springs, Florida.

References

Rivers of Florida
Rivers of Orange County, Florida
Rivers of Seminole County, Florida